Riders of Justice is a 2020 Danish action comedy film directed and written by Anders Thomas Jensen. The film was released in Denmark on 19 November 2020, receiving positive reviews from critics.

Plot 
Mathilde loses her mother in a train accident and her father, Markus, a serving soldier in Afghanistan, comes home to console his grieving daughter. Mathilde and Markus find it difficult to come to terms with the tragedy, causing strain in their relationship. However, Markus is approached by a man named Otto (who was on the same train with Markus's wife) who informs him that the train accident wasn't a coincidence, but a planned murder to eliminate a key witness about to give evidence against the leader of the "Riders of Justice" motorbike-criminal gang.

With the help of Otto's friends, Lennart and Emmenthaler, the group identifies a suspicious man who left the train seconds before the accident as the brother of the Riders of Justice's leader. The group goes to the man's house, intending to interrogate him for information about the accident, but Markus loses control and kills him out of anger. Lennart disposes of the evidence, and encounters a young Ukrainian boy named Bodashka. The Riders interrogate Bodashka for information, leading to their identification of Emmenthaler.

The Riders attempt a drive-by shooting on the group, but Markus is able to kill the attackers and rescue Bodashka. Mathilde discovers one of the group's meetings, and Lennart lies and explains that they are actually a therapy group attempting to help Markus with his trauma.

As the ensemble prepares another hit on the Riders of Justice, Bodashka explains that the suspicious man was not on the train; Lennart and Otto had convinced Emmenthaler to accept a less accurate facial recognition result, and the suspicious man was actually an Egyptian tourist, meaning that their crusade against the Riders of Justice was committed in error, and the evidence they relied on was a simple coincidence. Markus, learning this, breaks down in anger and frustration, finally lowering his stony facade and crying.

The next day, the Riders follow social media connections left by Mathilde's boyfriend and attack the group at Markus' house. Several of them are injured, Mathilde is taken hostage, and Markus is disarmed by the Riders. Otto, Lennart, and Emmenthaler, using weapons training Markus gave them earlier, ambush and kill the Riders, saving Markus and Mathilde.

A few months later, during Christmas, the entire group have joined to celebrate and open presents, and Markus and Mathilde have reconciled.

Cast 
Mads Mikkelsen as Markus Hansen
Nikolaj Lie Kaas as Otto Hoffmann
Andrea Heick Gadeberg as Mathilde Hansen
Lars Brygmann as Lennart
Nicolas Bro as Emmenthaler
Gustav Lindh as Bodashka
Roland Møller as Kurt
 as Sirius
Anne Birgitte Lind as Emma Hansen
 as Palle Olesen / Aharon Nahas Shadid
 as Kenneth
Henrik Noël Olesen as Noah
Gustav Dyekjær Giese as Adrian

Reception

Box office 

The movie opened to Danish cinemas on November 19, 2020, selling 150,486 tickets for the opening weekend and pre-premieres; beating out Another Round for best selling opening weekend in Denmark that year.

Critical response 
The website's critics consensus reads: "A darkly humorous revenge thriller with satisfying depth and a dash of savory quirk, Riders of Justice makes another compelling case for Mads Mikkelsen as an all-purpose leading man." 

The film was met with a favorable critical response from the Danish press. Politiken called Riders of Justice "Anders Thomas Jensen's best movie since Flickering Lights", giving it 5 out of 6 hearts.

B.T. remarked that the movie does not have as many memorable scenes as a number of Anders Thomas Jensen's previous movies, but has as significant an emotional impact as Another Round.

References

External links 
 

2020 action comedy films
2020 films
Danish action comedy films
Danish comedy-drama films
Films directed by Anders Thomas Jensen
Films with screenplays by Anders Thomas Jensen
2020s Danish-language films
Zentropa films